The Rampe de Laffrey (sometimes called the descente de Laffrey or the côte de Laffrey) is a section of France's Route nationale 85, today called the Route Napoléon, in the department of Isère between the communes of Laffrey and Vizille, about 15 kilometers southeast of Grenoble.  This steep and mostly relatively straight section of road ends in a sharp turn, and it is known for the high number of fatal accidents that have occurred in this final curve. Four of them, in 1946, 1973, 1975, and 2007, involved buses of pilgrims returning from Notre Dame de la Salette, and are among the deadliest in French history.

Design of the ramp
The slope begins in the center of the village of Laffrey at a height of 910 meters, right on the edge of the Matheysine plateau.  It descends over 600 metres along the mountainside, passing through the territories of Saint-Pierre-de-Mésage and Notre-Dame-de-Mésage. It then veers sharply to the right at the bridge over the Romanche and entering the town of Vizille, at a height of 300 meters. The road is only slightly sinuous, but at its beginning contains many broad turns while remaining relatively stable near its end. Its steep slope is its most notable feature, averaging 12% along its lower portion and 16 to 18% in some places; it finishes with a 110° turn before the bridge on the Romanche it. Because of its unusual design, Berliet used it  until 1970 for testing its trucks. It was also used for motorcycle races beginning in 1960, and at one time was considered a possibility for an Alpine stage of the Tour de France.

Reconfiguration to July 2007

After a pair of accidents in the 1970s, the route was heavily reworked to make it safer for light vehicles and load-bearing vehicles, but modifications to safely accommodate buses were considered too expensive and difficult. The road was widened, and several sections near the summit were expanded to three lanes. Vehicles over eight tons and buses, except those serving regular local routes, were banned from using the road without specific authorization from the local prefect. Those local and regular services are allowed only on specially designed vehicles with speed-reducers.  Buses and trucks coming from the regular route are requested to exit at La Mure and to take secondary road 529 past the massif of Conest towards Grenoble. Many violations of this rule have been noted, though. To discourage violators, a sign with a skull with flickering eyes was formerly installed at the top of the road; however, it was soon removed after being considered in poor taste and politically incorrect.

Modifications after the accident of July 22, 2007
On July 25, 2007, as a result of the most recent accident on the ramp, French Prime Minister François Fillon held a press conference to announce a series of measures to prevent such a heavy vehicle from attempting the descent again.  Flashing signs were installed within days, as were speed bumps at the level of the road signs, designed to ensure driver attention to these signs.  In July 2008, height gauges were also set up to physically prevent access for vehicles over a certain height.  Authorised vehicles, such as local buses equipped with an improved braking system, are issued with a magnetic card allowing them to bypass the height gauge.

Accidents
Many accidents have taken place along this stretch of road; at least 150 deaths have been recorded at the site between 1946 and 2007, primarily of pilgrims returning from Our Lady of La Salette.  It is the deadliest roadway section anywhere in France.

In 1946, a bus transporting pilgrims from Our Lady of La Salette crashed into a ravine, killing 18; today a memorial to the dead stands along the roadside near Saint-Pierre-de-Mésage.
In 1956, a Dutch bus suffered the same fate at the same place; seven were killed.
In 1968, a truck flew off the road, killing its two occupants.
In 1970, another bus transporting pilgrims flew over several walls before coming to a stop; five passengers, from Nord, were killed.  The cause of this accident was later determined to be excessive speed.
Another bus full of pilgrims, returning again from Our Lady of La Salette, crashed near the base of the road in 1973; 43 Belgians were killed.
In 1974, a truck without brakes hit a car, killing four.
Another bus returning from Our Lady of La Salette crashed near the base of the road in 1975, in the same location as the previous bus; 29 were killed.
In 2007, yet another bus full of pilgrims, this time from Poland,  crashed on the road, killing 26.

Appearances in Tour de France
The section was first included in the Tour de France in 1951 and has since featured 8 times, most recently in 2010.

References

Roads in France
Isère